Eragrostis peruviana is a species of flowering plant in the family Poaceae, native to Peru to northern Chile, including the Desventuradas Islands. It was first described by Nikolaus Joseph von Jacquin in 1787 as Poa peruviana, and transferred to Eragrostis by Carl Bernhard von Trinius in 1830.

References

peruviana
Flora of Peru
Flora of northern Chile
Flora of the Desventuradas Islands
Plants described in 1787